An election was held on 1 June 2005 in order to elect the regent of Kutai Kartanegara Regency in the Indonesian province of East Kalimantan. The election was the first ever direct local election in the country following the fall of Suharto.

Incumbent Syaukani Hasan Rais, affiliated with Suharto's Golkar Party, participated in the direct elections and secured over 60 percent of total votes, comfortably gaining his second term. In total, three pairs of candidates contested the elections and over 265,000 of the regency's residents voted.

Background
Indonesia's Law No. 32 of 2004 on regional administration mandates the holding of local elections for its provinces and regencies/cities. It also gives rights to local electoral commissions (Komisi Pemilihan Umum Daerah) to hold them. Prior to this, elections were held indirectly with governors, mayors and regents being elected in a vote by local councils.

Overview
Registered candidates were verified and officially declared on 26 April 2015. Kutai Kartanegara's electoral commission set a rotating campaign schedule between 15 and 28 May, dividing the regency into 3 sections in each candidate pairs spends one-thirds of the allotted time in before moving into the next section.

The budget for the elections was set at Rp 19 billion (~USD 2 million). According to the electoral commission, difficult geographical conditions highly affected the cost of logistics. In total, there were over 375,000 eligible voters voting in 1,397 polling stations across 212 villages in the regency's 18 subdistricts.

A quick count was released by Pokja 30, a local organization, supported by the US-based National Democratic Institute. Votes had to be retaken in one of the polling stations. Multiple NGOs observed irregularities with the elections, including fictional/duplicate voters, inflated voter lists, vote buying and intimidation, with Pokja 30 alone reporting at least 30 such cases.

Candidates

Syaukani Hasan Rais was the incumbent and first leader of the regency, although his term expired in December 2004 and his post was occupied by an acting regent from the Ministry of Home Affairs. He was accused of corruption in 2001, but the allegations were dropped following his victory in the election. Having served two terms as Golkar's cadre in his post, he received strong support from the party.

Results

References

Kutai Kartanegara Regency
Kutai Kartanegara
Regency elections in Indonesia